A poinsettia cocktail is a mixture of champagne, Cointreau (or Triple Sec), and cranberry juice. It is named after the poinsettia flower, commonly associated with Christmas.

See also

 List of cocktails

References

Cocktails with Champagne
Cocktails with triple sec or curaçao